The 2020 Ohio State Buckeyes football team represented Ohio State University in the 2020 NCAA Division I FBS football season. They were led by second-year head coach Ryan Day, and played their home games at Ohio Stadium in Columbus, Ohio. It was the Buckeyes' 131st season overall and 108th as a member of the Big Ten Conference.

The season was played amidst the ongoing COVID-19 pandemic. The Big Ten Conference initially cancelled the fall sports season, on August 11, 2020, but reversed course on September 16, announcing an eight-game conference-only schedule. Ohio State's nonconference games against Bowling Green, Oregon, and Buffalo were cancelled. Precautions were taken to promote player, staff, and fan safety, including regular COVID-19 testing, isolation requirements, and mask wearing; games were largely played with no or few fans in attendance.

Ohio State began the season ranked second in the preseason AP Poll. In the regular season, the team secured victories against ranked opponents Penn State and Indiana, but had games canceled, due to COVID-19 outbreaks, against Maryland, Illinois and Michigan. Big Ten Conference rules established before the season specified that teams would need to complete at least six conference games in order to be eligible for the conference championship game. After Ohio State's game against Michigan was canceled, and Ohio State having only completed five games, the conference voted to change these rules and allow the undefeated Ohio State team to represent the East Division. The conference cited the fact that Ohio State would have won the division with either a win or loss against Michigan. In the conference title game, Ohio State defeated West Division champion Northwestern, 22–10, winning their fourth consecutive Big Ten title. In the final College Football Playoff rankings of the season, Ohio State was ranked third, earning them a place in the national semi-final game to be played at the Sugar Bowl against second-seeded Clemson. In that game, a rematch of the previous season's semifinal, Ohio State won by a score of 49–28. The team advanced to the CFP National Championship against top-seeded Alabama, who had advanced by winning the Rose Bowl. The Buckeyes lost, 52–24.

The Buckeye offense was led by junior quarterback Justin Fields, who led the Big Ten Conference with 2,100 passing yards and 22 passing touchdowns, and was named the conference's Offensive Player of the Year. The team's leading rushers were Trey Sermon and Master Teague, the former setting a school record with 331 rushing yards in the Big Ten Championship Game. Wide receivers Chris Olave and Garrett Wilson were each named first-team all-conference. Offensive lineman Wyatt Davis was a consensus All-American and the conference's Offensive Lineman of the Year. On defense, the team featured consensus All-American cornerback Shaun Wade, who was the conference's Defensive Back of the Year. Linebacker Pete Werner was also named first-team all-conference and led the team in tackles.

Previous season

The Buckeyes finished the 2019 season 13–1, 9–0 in Big Ten play to win the East division. They defeated Wisconsin in the Big Ten Championship 34–21. Subsequently, they received an invitation to the College Football Playoff, where they lost to Clemson 29–23 in the Fiesta Bowl.

Schedule
Ohio State had games scheduled against Bowling Green, Oregon, and Buffalo, but canceled these games on July 9 due to the Big Ten Conference's decision to play a conference-only schedule due to the COVID-19 pandemic. The Big Ten successfully voted to postpone all fall sports, including football, on August 11, but announced on September 16 that the decision had been reversed, and that the football season would begin on October 23.

In Big Ten Conference play, Ohio State will play all members of the East Division and the Nebraska Cornhuskers and Illinois Fighting Illini from the West Division. On November 11, Maryland announced the game scheduled for November 14 was canceled due after team-related activities were paused because of an elevated number of coronavirus cases within the Terrapins' program.

On November 27, it was announced that head coach Ryan Day contracted COVID-19 and was in self isolation. Larry Johnson was named interim head coach for the Illinois game to be played on November 28. On the evening of November 27, the Ohio State - Illinois game was officially canceled as the OSU athletic department paused all team-related football activities amid further positive tests for COVID-19 were discovered.

On December 8, Michigan announced the game scheduled for December 12 was canceled and all team-related activities were paused because of an elevated number of coronavirus cases within the Wolverines' program. Due to the cancellation, Ohio State would have not reached the 6 game minimum for the Big Ten Championship Game, but the conference lowered the minimum requirement to 5 games, allowing the team to face the Northwestern Wildcats in the championship game.

On December 19, Ohio State beat the Northwestern Wildcats in the Big Ten Championship game 22–10. The following day, the Buckeyes were selected as the No. 3 seed by the College Football Playoff Selection Committee, resulting in a spot in the Sugar Bowl against the No. 2 Clemson Tigers.

On January 1, 2021, the Ohio State defeated the Clemson Tigers in the Sugar Bowl 49–28, advancing them to the College Football Playoff National Championship game against the No. 1 Alabama Crimson Tide.

Rankings

(*) Big Ten Conference members were not eligible for the Week 2 of the AP and Coaches Polls and Week 3 of the AP due to not having a scheduled season at the time.

Roster

Game summaries

Nebraska

The No. 5 Ohio State Buckeyes defeated the Nebraska Cornhuskers 52–17, in what was both programs' season debut. Both programs were reportedly behind the movement to reinstate Big Ten Football in the Fall. The game was featured on Fox College Football's Big Noon Kickoff, with the hosts on location. The Ohio State Buckeyes were 27.5-point favorites.

at No. 18 Penn State

The No. 3 Ohio State Buckeyes defeated the No. 18 Penn State Nittany Lions 38–25 in their annual rivalry game. It was the first time since 2009, that Penn State hosted Ohio State without the White Out due to crowd restrictions from the COVID-19 pandemic. The game was featured on ESPN Saturday Night Football on ABC and hosted the College GameDay. The Ohio State Buckeyes were 10.5 point favorites.

Justin Fields was named co–Offensive Player of the Week for the Big Ten for completing 28 of 34 passing attempts for 318 yards and four touchdowns. Defensive tackle Tommy Togiai was named Big Ten Defensive Player of the Week for his performance which included seven tackles and three sacks.

Rutgers

The No. 3 Ohio State Buckeyes defeated the Rutgers Scarlet Knights 49–27. The game was featured on BTN. The Ohio State Buckeyes were 37.5 point favorites.

at Maryland (Cancelled)

The Ohio State at Maryland game was canceled due to a COVID-19 outbreak within the Maryland football program. The game will not be rescheduled. Instead, both teams will have a bye and will play just seven games.

No. 9 Indiana

The No. 3 Ohio State Buckeyes defeated the No. 9 Indiana Hoosiers 42–35. The game was featured on Fox College Football's Big Noon Kickoff. The Ohio State Buckeyes were 21 point favorites.

at Illinois (Cancelled)

The No. 4 Ohio State at Illinois game was canceled due to a COVID-19 outbreak within the Ohio State football program. The game will not be rescheduled. Instead, both teams will have a bye and Illinois will play just seven games, while Ohio State will play just six games.

at Michigan State

The No. 4 Ohio State Buckeyes defeated the Michigan State Spartans 52–12. The game was featured on ESPN College Football on ABC. The Ohio State Buckeyes were 24 point favorites. Ohio State head coach Ryan Day did not coach due to COVID-19 protocols after a positive COVID-19 test. Instead, associate head coach Larry Johnson was acting head coach, serving as the first black head coach in Buckeye football history.

Michigan (Cancelled)

The Michigan at No. 4 Ohio State game was canceled due to a COVID-19 outbreak within the Michigan football program. The game will not be rescheduled.

vs. No. 14 Northwestern

The No. 4 Ohio State Buckeyes defeated the No. 14 Northwestern Wildcats 22–10 in the Big Ten Championship Game. The Ohio State Buckeyes were 16.5 point favorites.

vs. No. 2 Clemson

The No. 3 Ohio State Buckeyes defeated the No. 2 Clemson Tigers 49–28 in the Sugar Bowl at the Mercedes-Benz Superdome in New Orleans, Louisiana. The Ohio State Buckeyes were 7 point underdogs to the Clemson Tigers.

vs. No. 1 Alabama

The No. 3 Ohio State Buckeyes lost to the No. 1 Alabama Crimson Tide in the CFP National Championship at the Hard Rock Stadium in Miami Gardens, Florida. Ohio State entered the game as 8.5 point underdogs.

Awards and honors

Players drafted into the NFL

References

Ohio State
Ohio State Buckeyes football seasons
Big Ten Conference football champion seasons
Sugar Bowl champion seasons
Ohio State Buckeyes football